Whips have managed business and maintained party discipline for Malaysia's federal political parties in the Dewan Rakyat. A party's more senior whip held the title "Chief Whip", while the more junior whip was styled "Deputy Whip".

Current Chief Whip

By party

Barisan Nasional 

 Abdullah Ahmad Badawi (2000 – 2003)
 Najib Razak (2004 – 2009)
 Muhyiddin Yassin (2009 – 2015)
 Ahmad Zahid Hamidi (2015 – 2018)
 Azalina Othman Said (May 2018 – October 2018)
 Ismail Sabri Yaakob (October 2018 – March 2019)
 Mahdzir Khalid (March 2019 – May 2020) 
 Ahmad Zahid Hamidi (May 2020 – current)

Democratic Action Party 

 Tan Seng Giaw ( ? – 2013)
 Anthony Loke Siew Fook (2013 - 2022)
 Nga Kor Ming (2022 - present)

People's Justice Party 

 Mohamed Azmin Ali (2008-2013)
 Johari Abdul (2013-2022)

Malaysian United Indigenous Party 

 Mohamed Azmin Ali (2020-2022)
 Radzi Jidin (2022-present)

Malaysian Islamic Party 

 Kamaruddin Jaffar (2004 - 2008)
 Salahuddin Ayub (2008 - 2013)
 Mahfuz Omar (2013 - 2015)
 Takiyuddin Hassan (2015 - 2020)
 Nik Muhammad Zawawi Salleh (2020 - present)

Sabah Heritage Party 

 Rozman Isli (2020)

Gabungan Parti Sarawak 

 Fadillah Yusof (2018 - current)

National Trust Party 

 Hasanuddin Mohd Yunus (2018-2022)
 Dzulkefly Ahmad (2022-present)

See also
 Party whip (Malaysia)

References

Parliament of Malaysia
Lists of members of the Parliament of Malaysia
Members of the Dewan Rakyat